Besbes is a surname. Notable people with the surname include:

Azza Besbes (born 1990), Tunisian sabre fencer, sister of Sarra
Sarra Besbes (born 1989), Tunisian épée fencer